This is a list of Swedish television related events from 1969.

Events
1 March - Tommy Körberg is selected to represent Sweden at the 1969 Eurovision Song Contest with his song "Judy, min vän". He is selected to be the eleventh Swedish Eurovision entry during Melodifestivalen 1969 held in Stockholm.

Debuts

Television shows

1960s
Hylands hörna (1962-1983)

Ending this year

Births

Deaths

See also
1969 in Sweden